"The Sign" is a song by Swedish group Ace of Base from their first North American studio album, The Sign (1993), and their re-released debut studio album, Happy Nation (1992), titled Happy Nation (U.S. Version). The song was released as a single in Europe on 1 November 1993, and in the US on 14 December 1993. It was written by band member Jonas Berggren, who also produced the song with Denniz Pop and Douglas Carr. "The Sign" is a techno-reggae, Europop, and pop ballad with lyrics describing a couple contemplating the state of their relationship.

"The Sign" topped the Billboard Hot 100 for six non-consecutive weeks in the United States, which allowed Ace of Base to become the first Swedish group to simultaneously have a number one song and album on the Hot 100 and Billboard 200 respectively. Consequently, the song was ranked as the number one song of 1994 on Billboards year-end chart. It also reached number one in countries such as Australia, Canada, Germany, and New Zealand, and peaked at number two on the UK Singles Chart. "The Sign" was nominated for Grammy Award for Best Pop Performance by a Duo or Group with Vocals at the 37th Annual Grammy Awards.

Background and development
Ace of Base originally released their debut studio album Happy Nation in 1992, which did not include "The Sign", as it was intended to be for their next album. The head of Arista Records, Clive Davis, heard the song's demo, and in turn passed it to Swedish producers Douglas Carr and Denniz Pop, as he wanted something different from Happy Nation. The demo only contained the song's instrumental, which Pop thought that the verse was the chorus. In contrast to their 1992 single "All That She Wants", Pop knew what he wanted to do with the song from the beginning.

"The Sign" was recorded at Cheiron Studios in Stockholm, Sweden. Ace of Base members Linn and Jenny Berggren re-arranged the song like they wanted to, so that it would become a duet between both women. Jenny played around with the chords at the end and composed the harmonies around it. In an interview with Idolator, Jonas Berggren stated that Jenny and Linn split the chorus into two parts, with the former singing the second and fourth parts. He acknowledged that it "was hard to sing" since there was no breathing time. The song was recorded at a loud volume, which caused the producers Pop, Douglas Carr, and Jonas Berggren, to lower the sound by three decibels during audio mastering.

Composition
"The Sign" is a techno-reggae, Europop, and pop ballad. The song's lyrics describe a couple contemplating the state of their relationship and deciding to split up as a result. During recording, Jonas Berggren added hums between the melody lines to become "major and minor" with the chorus being "mostly major", as he believed that the song was originally "too merry". He added that the lyrics are "about thinking back on an old [relationship]", but are deliberately oblique to allow listeners to form their own meanings. Jenny Berggren compared the lyrics to the "road of life" metaphor, noting, "You see signs in your life, and that's why you change direction."

"The Sign" is performed in the key of G major for the verses and chorus but in G minor for the intro and instrumental breaks. It follows a tempo of 97 beats per minute in common time. According to the sheet music published at Musicnotes.com by Universal Music Publishing Group, the group's vocals span from the low note of A3 to the high note of E5. The song initially begins with the sounds of a hand clap, kick drum, and snare over a four bar beat, which was sampled from "Shack Up" by American funk group Banbarra. The melodic hook contains a synth flute, with a bass combining a Moog sub-bass and a Korg M1 bass. Throughout the verses, a Yamaha TG77 synthesizer is used to create a reggae rhythm guitar sound. During the bridge, the band's vocal range increases by an octave.

Chart performance

In Europe "The Sign" reached number one in Denmark, Finland, Germany and Spain. On 28 November, it entered the Eurochart Hot 100 at number 29 and peaked at number two eight weeks later. Additionally, the song was a top 10 hit also in Austria, Belgium, France, Ireland (#2), Lithuania, the Netherlands, Norway, Scotland (#2), Sweden (#2), Switzerland and the United Kingdom (#2). In the latter, it peaked in its second week at UK Singles Chart on 27 February 1994. It was held off reaching the top spot by Mariah Carey's "Without You" (1994), and spent a total of three weeks as number two on the chart.

Outside Europe, "The Sign" peaked at number one in Australia, Israel, New Zealand Canada and Zimbabwe. In the United States the song topped the Billboard Hot 100 on the chart dated 12 March 1994. This allowed Ace of Base to become the first Swedish group to simultaneously score a number one single and album on the Billboard charts. "The Sign" also topped the US Cash Box Top 100. "The Sign" was the number one song of 1994 according to Billboard magazine's year-end charts. The song was ranked at number 60 on The Billboard Hot 100 All-Time Top Songs for the first 55 years of the Hot 100 chart, and received a nomination for Grammy Award for Best Pop Performance by a Duo or Group with Vocals at the 1995 Grammy Awards.

In 1994, Music & Media published as assessment of the chart performance of "The Sign", which stated that it "entered Border Breakers at number ten on November 21, 1993, due to crossover airplay in Central Europe. It also peaked twice at number one; on December 18, staying for five weeks and again on March 9 for a two week stay. It entered the Eurochart November 28 at 29 and peaked at two eight weeks later", and that it "[...] also holds the record for longest-running single on Border Breakers—42 weeks before slipping off on August 20."

Critical reception
AllMusic editor Stephen Thomas Erlewine stated that the success of singles such as "The Sign" was attributed to "relentless" beats and an "incessantly catchy" hook. Howard Cohen from Herald-Journal noted that it is flavoured with "faux reggae rhythms". Chuck Campbell from Scripps Howard News Service claimed that "The Sign" "could be a bigger hit" than "All That She Wants", due to its "infectious Europop energy and cosmic synths set to a reggae beat". Writing for the Dance Update column of Music Week, James Hamilton described it as a "US smash typical 96.7bpm cod-reggae jogger". Jim Farber from New York Daily News compared the song's "dinky synths, impish dance beats and miniaturized vocals" to musicians from the 1980s such as A Flock of Seagulls and Falco. Neil Strauss from The New York Times wrote that Ace of Base used "a deceptively mystical hook over a minimal bass line" to create the song. A reviewer from People acknowledged that tunes like "The Sign" "prove Ace of Base to be more substantive than a mere ABBA clone." Press-Telegram stated that it is "packed with unforgettable hooks". The Rolling Stone Album Guide compared "The Sign" to Gloria Gaynor's 1978 song "I Will Survive", writing that it was "the wisest, catchiest, most triumphant kiss-off". 

Chuck Eddy of LA Weekly labeled the music video as "fun", but described "The Sign" as undistinctive. Mario Tarradell from Miami Herald opined that the song was "annoyingly chirpy". Alan Jones from Music Week wrote that Ace of Base's attempts to imitate "All That She Wants" by using a "shuffling reggae beat" was "less charming and effective", but believed "The Sign" was "bright enough" to chart in the top 20 on the UK Singles Chart. Tom Doyle from Smash Hits gave "The Sign" two out of five in his review, stating that the reggae beat, saxophone, and tune were similar to "All That She Wants". Writing for Entertainment Weekly, David Thigpen described it as "a wasteland of neutered hip-hop and lumbering dance rhythms", criticizing Linn Berggren's vocals as "inert" and "colorless". Barry Walters for the San Francisco Examiner stated that the song "blankly chirps".

Legacy
Amos Barshad of Vulture stated in his retrospective review of the band's 1993 studio album The Sign that "The Sign" "is still a very good pop song" despite being outdated in production techniques, stating that it sounded analog. American singer Katy Perry acknowledged in a 2009 MTV News interview that the song, along with the Cardigans' 1996 song "Lovefool", served as an inspiration for her recordings. John Seabrook, a staff writer at The New Yorker, praised the song in his 2015 book The Song Machine: Inside the Hit Factory, stating that "the song is a three-minute, thirty-second sonic thrill rise of Swedish funk." He also acknowledged that the song's success was due to three people: Denniz Pop, Clive Davis, and Clive Calder. Seabrook concluded that it had an influential impact on pop music, suggesting that "a Swedish hit factory for US and British artists had never happened before. ... 'The Sign' really was the sign that that could happen". Annie Zaleski from The A.V. Club wrote that the song "is full of cheerful shade", noting that it combined a "breezy reggae vibe" with 1990s Europop. Bob Waliszewski of Plugged In noted that the song's lyrics "demonstrate[s] strength in the wake of romantic rejection".

Idolator ranked "The Sign" at number one on their ranking of The 50 Best Pop Singles of 1994, with author Robbie Daw writing that it "was a straight-up smash that was tailor made for radio". Rolling Stone placed the song at number 42 on their list of 50 Best Songs of the Nineties, while BuzzFeed listed the song at number 28 on their 2017 list of The 101 Greatest Dance Songs Of the '90s. Billboard ranked "The Sign" at number 65 on their 2018 ranking of All-Time Top 100 Songs, stating in a separate article that it "led pop into a new era, putting Sweden on the map as a credible hitmaking hub, pushing electronic production closer to the forefront of popular music and helping ignite a collaborative approach to songwriting that has become an industry standard".

Accolades

(*) indicates the list is unordered.

Music video

The accompanying music video for "The Sign" is directed by Mathias Julien and was shot on Filmhuset in Stockholm in November 1993. The opening of the video is a homage to Depeche Mode's 1990 song "Enjoy the Silence". It features the Ace of Base members singing amidst romantic and joyful images; "The Sign" was depicted as a computer generated ankh and a djed. Amid the images is a little story of a man and woman (played by Jenny Berggren) sitting side by side until the man leaves, seemingly abandoning the woman. However, he comes back with a rose and offers it to the woman. The woman graciously accepts and takes his hand. However, a bright light shines in the woman's face, drawing her away, abandoning the man and dropping the rose on the chair. The video received heavy rotation on MTV Europe and was A-listed on Germany's VIVA. As of December 2022, "The Sign" has over 107 million views on YouTube.

Track listings

Credits and personnel
Credits adapted from the liner notes of The Sign.
 Vocals by Linn Berggren, Jenny Berggren and Jonas Berggren
 Backing vocals by Linn Berggren, Jenny Berggren, Jonas Berggren and Douglas Carr
 Written by Jonas Berggren
 Produced by Denniz Pop, Douglas Carr and Jonas Berggren
 Recorded at Cheiron Studios

Release history

Charts

Weekly charts

Year-end charts

Decade-end charts

All-time charts

Certifications

References

1993 singles
Ace of Base songs
Number-one singles in Australia
Number-one singles in New Zealand
Billboard Hot 100 number-one singles
Number-one singles in Denmark
Number-one singles in Finland
Number-one singles in Germany
Number-one singles in Israel
Number-one singles in Spain
Number-one singles in Zimbabwe
Songs written by Jonas Berggren
Song recordings produced by Denniz Pop
RPM Top Singles number-one singles
Arista Records singles
Mega Records singles
Pop ballads
Songs written by Linn Berggren
Songs written by Ulf Ekberg
Songs written by Jenny Berggren
1993 songs
1990s ballads
Music videos directed by Mathias Julien